Carlos Luís Carreño Cejudo (born 19 April 1973) is a Spanish volleyball player who represented his native country at the 2000 Summer Olympics in Sydney, Australia. There he finished ninth place with the Men's National Team.

Sporting achievements

National team
 1995  Universiade

References

  Spanish Olympic Committee

1973 births
Living people
Spanish men's volleyball players
Volleyball players at the 2000 Summer Olympics
Olympic volleyball players of Spain
Universiade medalists in volleyball
Universiade silver medalists for Spain
Medalists at the 1995 Summer Universiade
Sportspeople from Almería